Walthall Mill, Virginia is an unincorporated community located in Chesterfield County. The community is situated at the intersection of Virginia State Route 145 and State Route 144.

See also 
 Centralia, Virginia

References 

Unincorporated communities in Chesterfield County, Virginia
Greater Richmond Region
Unincorporated communities in Virginia